Université Gaston Berger, also known as UGB Saint-Louis or simply UGB, is a Senegalese basketball club based in Saint-Louis. The team competes in the Nationale 1, the highest national level. It is the basketball section of the Gaston Berger University. The team has won one Senegalese championship and two Cup titles.

History
UGB won its first Senegalese Cup title in 2010, after beating DUC Dakar in the final. Two years later, in 2012, UGB won its first ever Nationale 1 title. A year later, it won its second cup title.

Honours
Nationale 1
Champions (1): 2012
Runners-up (1): 2015
Senegalese Cup
Champions (2): 2010, 2013

Season by season

References

Basketball teams in Senegal
Basketball teams established in 2007